Universities Scotland was formed in 1992 as the Committee of Scottish Higher Education Principals (COSHEP) adopting its current name in 2000, when Universities UK was also formed.  It represents 19 autonomous higher education institutions, 16 of them with University status and three other higher education institutions in Scotland. The Convener serves a two-year term of office. As of 2022, this post is held by Professor Sir Gerry McCormac, principal of the University of Stirling, while Alastair Sim has served as the organization's Director since 2009.

Members
The following are members:

Aberdeen
University of Aberdeen
Robert Gordon University

Dundee
Abertay University
University of Dundee

Edinburgh
University of Edinburgh
Edinburgh Napier University
Heriot-Watt University
Queen Margaret University

Glasgow
University of Glasgow
Glasgow Caledonian University
Glasgow School of Art
Royal Conservatoire of Scotland
University of Strathclyde

St Andrews
University of St Andrews

Stirling
University of Stirling

Multiple Cities
Open University in Scotland
Scotland's Rural College
University of the Highlands and Islands
University of the West of Scotland

See also
Universities UK
List of universities in Scotland

References

External links
Website

2000 establishments in Scotland
Organizations established in 2000
Higher education in Scotland
Higher education organisations based in the United Kingdom
Organisations based in Edinburgh
Educational organisations based in Scotland